Quadruplex  may refer to:
 Quadruplex (New Orleans), a softball complex in New Orleans City Park
 Quadruplex telegraph, an improvement on the electrical telegraph patented in 1874 by Thomas Edison
 Two-inch quadruplex videotape, the first practical and commercially successful videotape format
 G-quadruplex, a four-stranded nucleic acid structure rich in guanine 
 C-quadruplex, a four-stranded nucleic acid structure rich in cytosine, found in I-motif DNA
 Quadruplex, a building split into four apartments, similar to a duplex